The Hudson Wasp is an automobile that was built and marketed by the Hudson Motor Car Company of Detroit, Michigan, from the 1952 through the 1956 model years. After Hudson merged with Nash Motors, the Wasp was then built by American Motors Corporation in Kenosha, Wisconsin, and marketed under its Hudson marque for model years 1955 and 1956.

The Hudson Wasp can be classified by two distinct model year generations: from 1952 to 1954 when it used Hudson's existing short-wheelbase platform, and in 1955 and 1956 when it was built on the full-sized Nash platform, with completely different designs for each of these two model years.

Model years

1952–1954 

The Wasp (Series 58) was introduced by Hudson for the 1952 model year as an upgraded version of the Hudson Pacemaker, replacing the Hudson Super Custom models from 1951. The Wasp was available in two- and four-door sedan, convertible, and a 2-door hardtop designated the Hollywood. Hudson's unitized structure used a perimeter frame which provided a rigid structure, low center of gravity, and side-impact protection for passengers.

The base Hudson Wasp used the  L-Head straight six from the Pacemaker. Hudson also offered the Super Wasp which used improved interior materials and a more powerful Hudson 6-cylinder engine. Instead of using the Pacemaker's  straight 6, the Super Wasp used Hudson's  L-Head six fed by a single 2-barrel carburetor. The  six's power was underrated so it would not outshine the flagship straight 8. The narrow block  engine was the basis for the stroked and reinforced Hornet  6-cylinder engine, introduced in 1951 which dominated NASCAR from 1952 to 1954. The Super Wasp was also offered with an aluminum "twin H" manifold and twin 2-barrel carburetors. Super Wasp performance with the "twin H" induction matched the performance of the big 2-barrel  equipped, but heavier, Hudson Hornet.

Wasp model year production saw 21,876 units in 1953 and 17,792 units in 1954, its final year before the Hudson merger with Nash-Kelvinator Corporation.

1955 
For 1955 the Wasp became a product of the newly formed American Motors Corporation (AMC). Following the end of 1954 model year production, Hudson's Detroit manufacturing facility was closed and assembly of Hudson models was shifted to Nash's factory in Kenosha, Wisconsin. All Hudsons would be based on the senior Nash models, but would have exclusive Hudson styling.

After Hudson's 1954 merger with Nash, 1955 Hudsons were built on the unitized Nash platforms. The 1955 Hornet was built on the 1955 Nash Ambassador platform and offered with the big Hornet  I6 engine, as well as a detuned  V8 engine supplied by Packard. The 1955 Hudson Wasp was built on the Nash Statesman platform. For 1955, the Wasp was offered with Hudson's  I6 previously used in the Hudson Jet compact sedan and the Hudson Italia.

The 1955 Hudsons used Nash's long travel coil spring suspension, integrated and advanced Heating and ventilation system and were offered with air conditioning and reclining seats. Although comfortable, the Nash-based Hudsons were no longer competitive on the race tracks where they dominated from 1952 to 1954.

Hudson Wasp sales dropped to 7,191 units for the year as traditional Hudson buyers left the marque, viewing the cars as something less than the legendary Hudsons of the past.

1956 
For the 1956 model year, AMC executives decided to give the Wasp and Hornet more character in hopes of boosting sales. However, the plan backfired. Design for the vehicles was given over to designer Richard Arbib, who provided Hudson with one of the more distinctive looks in 1950s, which he called "V-Line Styling". Taking the traditional Hudson triangle, Arbib applied its "V" form in every conceivable manner across the interior and exterior of the car. Arbib's front-end combined a tightly woven egg-crate grille (a nod to the 1931 Hudson Greater Eight) bisected by a prominent "V" (a nod to the 1954 Hudson Italia). Combined with tri-tone paint combinations, the Hudson's new look was unique. However, the plan to build a better Hudson identity failed; the car's garish design failed to excite buyers. The Wasp was available only as a four-door sedan and its sales fell to 2,519 units in its final year of production.

End of production 
In 1957, AMC stripped Hudson of eleven of its fifteen models, including the Wasp.

Australian assembly
The Wasp was assembled in Australia from complete knock down (CKD) kits.

References

External links 

 Hudson Car Club
 Hudson-Essex-Terraplane Club

Wasp
Hudson Wasp
Coupés
Convertibles
Sedans
Rear-wheel-drive vehicles
Cars introduced in 1952
Full-size vehicles